Pineola may refer to:

Pineola, North Carolina
Pineola, Florida
Pineola, a track from Lucinda Williams' album Sweet Old World